Red Earth may refer to:

Music 
Red Earth (band), a Native American rock band from Albuquerque, New Mexico
Red Earth (Crash Vegas album), a 1989 album by Crash Vegas
Red Earth (Dee Dee Bridgewater album), a 2007 album by Dee Dee Bridgewater

People 
Chi Tu, also known as the Red Earth Kingdom
Red Earth First Nation, a Cree First Nation band government in Saskatchewan, Canada

Places 
Red Earth Creek, a hamlet in Alberta, Canada
Pucallpa (Quechua: "red earth"), a city in eastern Peru

Other 
 Red Earth Festival, a Native American arts and dance festival in Oklahoma City, Oklahoma
 Red Earth (company), an international chain of stores selling cosmetics and body care products
 Red Earth (video game), a 1996 fantasy-themed 2D competitive fighting arcade game by Capcom, that's also called War-Zard in Japan
 Red Earth, White Earth, a novel with a film adaptation
 Red Earth, White Lies, a book by Vine Deloria Jr.
 Red Earth, a tabletop role-playing game set in the Russian Civil War.